The 1995 CONCACAF Champions' Cup was the 31st edition of the annual international club football competition held in the CONCACAF region (North America, Central America and the Caribbean), the CONCACAF Champions' Cup. It determined that year's club champion of association football in the CONCACAF region and was played from 19 February till 17 December 1995.

The teams were split in 2 zones (North/ Central and Caribbean). The North/Central zone was split in 3 groups, qualifying each winner to the final tournament. The winner of the Caribbean zone, also got a place in that tournament. All qualifying matches in the tournament were played under the home/away match system, while the final tournament stage was played in San José, Costa Rica.

That final stage composed of four teams which played each other in a single round-robin tournament. Costa Rican team Saprissa crowned CONCACAF champion for second time, after finishing 1st in the final table with 7 points over 3 matches played.

North and Central American Zone

Group 1
First Round

Second Round

 Alajuelense on bye, to the third round.

Third Round

Group 2

First Round

Second Round

 CSD Municipal on bye, to the third round.

Third Round

Group 3

First Round

Second Round

Caribbean Zone
First round

Matches and results are unavailable: L'Aiglon US Sinnamary Topp XX FC

Second leg apparently not played.*
RCA withdrew,Beacon F.C. advances to the second round.***
Corona Boys, CS Moulien, AS Capoise, FICA, L'Aiglon, US Sinnamary, and Topp XX FC advance to the second round.

Second round

Beacon FC advanced; presumably L'Aiglon withdrew.*
AS Capoise withdrew.**
Both clubs apparently withdrew.***
CS Moulien advance to the third round.

Third round

 CS Moulien on bye, to the fourth round.
Beacon FC advance to the fourth round.

Fourth round

Beacon withdrew, both legs awarded 2–0 to CS Moulien.*
CS Moulien advance to Final Group stage.

Final Group stage 
All matches played in San José, Costa Rica

As of 17 December 1995

Matches

Champion

References

1
c